Pedro Camacho (Pedro José Camacho Cotto; born 26 November 1938 in Santurce, Puerto Rico) is a Puerto Rican former triple jumper who competed in the 1960 Summer Olympics.

References

External links
 

1938 births
Living people
Puerto Rican male triple jumpers
People from Santurce, Puerto Rico
Olympic track and field athletes of Puerto Rico
Athletes (track and field) at the 1960 Summer Olympics
Pan American Games competitors for Puerto Rico
Athletes (track and field) at the 1959 Pan American Games
Central American and Caribbean Games gold medalists for Puerto Rico
Competitors at the 1959 Central American and Caribbean Games
Central American and Caribbean Games medalists in athletics